Benjamin Fuß (born 28 June 1990 in Bad Salzungen) is a German footballer who plays for SG Barockstadt Fulda-Lehnerz.

Career 
Fuß began his career with FC Carl Zeiss Jena who was promoted to the second team on 1 July 2009, on 2 September 2009 made his professional debut in the 3rd Liga against Borussia Dortmund II.

References

External links 
 

1990 births
Living people
People from Bad Salzungen
People from Bezirk Suhl
German footballers
Footballers from Thuringia
Association football defenders
3. Liga players
FC Carl Zeiss Jena players
FSV Zwickau players